Tetovo is a municipality in the northwest part of North Macedonia. Tetovo's municipal seat is located in the town of the same name. Tetovo Municipality is part of the Polog Statistical Region.

Geography
The municipality borders Kosovo to the north and west, Tearce Municipality to the northeast, Jegunovce Municipality to the east, Želino Municipality to the southeast, Brvenica Municipality to the south, and Bogovinje Municipality to the southwest.

History
As a result of the redrawing of municipality borders in 2003, the rural Šipkovica Municipality and Džepčište Municipality were attached to Tetovo Municipality. Without these two municipalities, the population of the Municipality of Tetovo was 65,318 according to the census of 1994, and 70,841 at the last census. The population of the former Šipkovica Municipality in 1994 was 6,797, and according to the last census was 7,820. The population of the former Džepčište Municipality in 1994 was 7,286, and according to the last census was 7,919. The population of the present-day combined municipality is 86,580.

On 26 November 2019, an earthquake struck Albania and Tetovo Municipality held 2 days of mourning for the earthquake victims and sent humanitarian aid and 500,000 denars for relief efforts.

Demographics
The number of the inhabited places in the municipality is 20. There is one city and 19 villages. The population of the municipality is 84,770. Ethnic groups in the municipality include:

Inhabited places

There are 20 inhabited places in this municipality.

Historical photographs from Tetovo

References

External links
 Official website
 Tetovo municipality info

 
Polog Statistical Region
Municipalities of North Macedonia